The National Defense Battalions ( "Jahafel al-Difa' al-Watani") were Iraqi Kurdish paramilitary units. Initially emerging from pro-government Kurdish militia raised by the regime of Abd al-Karim Qasim used against Kurdish insurgents in the 1960s, the Battalions were used quite prominently during the Iran-Iraq War, particularly during the Anfal Campaign. Following the war many units rebelled in 1991 and joined the Peshmerga, although the Battalions survived, albeit in a reduced capacity, until the Ba'athist government was toppled in 2003.

Structure
The units originated in the early 1960s during the Iraqi government's counterinsurgency operations against Kurdish guerrillas. In the 1970s the Ba'athist Iraqi government exploited tribal divisions amongst the Kurds, and recruited various tribal leaders, allowing them to form militias from their followers. These units were armed with light weapons and were tasked with policing Kurdish areas, as well as providing intelligence to the Iraqi Army.

During the Iran-Iraq war the Battalions came under the operational command of the Directorate of Military Intelligence and the Army leadership in the Northern Command. The Northern Bureau of the Ba'ath party was responsible for operating and setting policies of the Battalions, as well as reporting on its leaders political activities, and maintaining control over the Battalion's Kurdish conscripts.

The Northern Bureau portrayed the Battalions as part of the Ba'ath party's plan to civilize and modernize the Kurdish population and turn them from tribesmen into Iraqi citizens. A Presidential decree therefore required military-aged men resident in the Autonomous Region to join the Battalions. In spite of official rhetoric the Battalions had been organised along tribal lines from the beginning, with Kurdish tribal leaders being responsible for both raising and maintaining the Battalions. The official title of the Kurdish tribal leaders was that of mutashar (consultant), in an attempt to hide the extent to which the leaders were subject to the power of the central government and government policy, with those deemed ineffective or potentially disloyal being replaced by other leaders within their clans or being forced to disband their units. Others, who chose to rebel, or defect, were summarily executed. One Battalion was disbanded because its leader was claiming he controlled 900 soldiers, when in fact he only had 90. Two other Battalions were disbanded, and their leaders executed, because one had failed to fight against the Iranians alongside the Iraqi Armed Forces, whereas the other had attempted to assassinate the commander of the 5th Army Corps. Meanwhile, the leader of the 24th Battalion was executed after rebelling in Mankish in Dohuk Province.

In predominantly Kurdish areas Battalion commanders came under the jurisdiction of the local Party branch, with Battalions being attached to the party offices for Ninewah, Ta'mim, Arbil, Sulaymaniyah, and Dohuk. The management of training camps, education sessions, the pursuit and capture of deserters, and the close surveillance of Battalion leaders and soldiers were central to the security operations of the Northern Bureau. By 1987 there were 147 Battalions, composing some 250,000 men, which made up nearly 10% of the total Kurdish population under the control of the Northern Bureau. Although 5 Battalions were disbanded in 1987 by the end of the Anfal campaign in August 1989 the force had grown to 321 Battalions made up of 412,636 soldiers. This increase was largely due to the forcible conscription of Kurds at the end of the Anfal campaign. The Battalions weren't only restricted to the North however, and some units even fought in the South in the defense of Basra during Operation Karbala-5.

In addition to their counterinsurgency role the Battalions were also seen as a means by which the government could absorb young Kurds, provide them with employment, and prevent or dissuade them from joining the insurgency. The government achieved only limited success however, with the units suffering high desertion rates. It was quite typical for men to continually shift between fighting in the insurgency and fighting in the Battalions. Both choices were problematic, with family members of insurgent being victim to forced deportations and imprisonment, whilst those in the Battalions became pariahs in wider Kurdish society. Desertion however was dangerous, with execution squads being commonplace on the frontlines.

Following the 1991 Gulf War, and the ensuing uprisings, the 100,000 strong force was dissolved and reorganized. The Battalions survived in a much diminsed capacity until 2003, but by 2002 there was only 1 brigade with ~1,000 men.

Legacy
The units were derisively referred to as jash.

The Battalions, due to their prominence in the Anfal Campaign, have been the subject of controversy in Iraqi Kurdistan. During the 1990s discussion of the Jash remained very much a taboo subject, however this changed following the PUK–KDP peace agreement, as well as the 2006–2007 Tribunal, with the Kurdish press opening up discussion on the subject. Views on the jash remain divided, although there has been a somewhat growing perception of the jash as being victims of circumstance, and being forced into the Battalions in order to protect themselves.

See also
 Republican Guard
 Popular Army

References

Paramilitary forces of Iraq
Military wings of nationalist parties
Ba'athist organizations
Saddam Hussein